This is a list of bookstore chains with brick-and-mortar locations.

In the United Kingdom and many parts of the English speaking world, they are known as "Bookshops" and "newsagents".

In American English, they are called "bookstores", or sometimes "newsstands", as they also usually carry newspapers and magazines.  This list includes both current and defunct businesses, and also includes large independent bookstores that have multiple locations, but that use a different business model than most business chains.

Australia

Current 
Angus & Robertson
W H Smith
Collins Booksellers
Dymocks Booksellers
Golds World Of Judaica
Kinokuniya
Koorong
Queensland Book Depot

Defunct 
 Borders
 The Co-op Bookshop

Brazil
Fnac
Livraria Cultura

Canada

Archambault
Book City
Chapters, Coles, and Indigo belong to the same corporation.
Kobo eBookstore
McNally Robinson
Renaud-Bray

China

Commercial Press
Joint Publishing
Page One
Popular

Estonia
Rahva Raamat

Finland
Academic Bookstore
Suomalainen Kirjakauppa ("The Finnish Bookstore")

France

 Flammarion
 Fnac (78 stores with book departments in France, 65 in 8 other countries)
 Hachette Distribution Services
 Furet du Nord

Germany

Hugendubel (34 book-department-stores)
Thalia
Verlagsgruppe Weltbild, Weltbild Plus, Weltbild, Weltbild best, Jokers, Wohlthat (circa 350-400 shops)

Greece
 Ianos

Iceland
 Penninn Eymundsson

India
 A. H. Wheeler
 Crossword Bookstores
 D. C. Books
 Higginbotham's
 Landmark Bookstores
 Odyssey
 Oxford Bookstore
 Sapna Book House

Indonesia
Gramedia
Gunung Agung

Ireland

 Eason & Son
 Hodges Figgis (part of the UK Waterstone's brand)

Israel
 Comikaza - former chain, still exists as a stand-alone store
 Steimatzky
 Tzomet Sfarim

Italy

 Feltrinelli
 Mondadori

Japan

 Book Off
 Kinokuniya
 LIBRO
 Tsutaya Bookstore
 Yurindo

Korea, South

 Jongro Seojuk (bankrupt, and name changed to Bandi & Luni's when re-opened)
 Kyobo Book Centre
 LIBRO (different from LIBRO in Japan)

Latvia
 Valters un Rapa

Malaysia

 Borders Malaysia
 Kinokuniya
 MPH Bookstores
 myNEWS.com
 Popular
 Times Bookstores

Mexico

 Fondo de Cultura Económica
 Librerias Gandhi (28 bookstores)
 Sanborns
 Porrúa

Netherlands

 AKO – owned by Audax Groep
 Bruna – owned by Audax Groep
 Libris – collaboration of independent booksellers
 Read Shop – owned by Audax Groep
 De Slegte – small independent chain

New Zealand

Current 
 Paper Plus
 Whitcoulls

Defunct 
 Borders
 Dymocks Booksellers

Pakistan

 Ferozsons

Philippines

 National Bookstore
 Rex Bookstore

Poland

 EMPIK
 Kolporter
 Matras

Portugal

 Fnac
 Livraria Bertrand

Saudi Arabia 
 Jarir Bookstore

Singapore
 Borders (ceased operation in 2011, but ownership changed to Popular Holdings in 2013)
 Kinokuniya
 MPH
 Page One
 Popular
 Times Bookstores

South Africa

 Exclusive Books

Switzerland
 Orell Füssli

Taiwan

 Eslite Bookstore
 Tsutaya Bookstore
 Kinokuniya

Thailand

 Asia Books
 B2S
 Dokya
 Nai-in

United Kingdom

Current

 Blackwell's (owned by Waterstones since 2022)
 Daunt Books
 Foyles (owned by Waterstones since 2018)
 WHSmith
 Waterstones
 The Works

Defunct

 Books Etc (owned by Borders)
 Borders (defunct in December 2009)
 Dillons Booksellers (all stores were rebranded as Waterstones in 1999)
 John Menzies (bought out by W H Smith in 1998)
 Ottakar's (bought out by HMV, rebranded as Waterstones in 2006)

United States

Current

 Amazon Books
 Barnes & Noble
 Bookmans
 Books-A-Million / 2nd & Charles
 Deseret Book, also operates Seagull Book
 Follett's
 Half Price Books
 Hudson News, chiefly located at airports and train stations
 Joseph-Beth Booksellers, also operates Davis-Kidd Booksellers in Nashville and Memphis
 Kinokuniya
 Powell's Books, which includes the world's largest independent new and used bookstore
 Schuler Books & Music
 Tattered Cover

Defunct

 Atlantic Books, discount chain on the East Coast, defunct as of 2012
 B. Dalton
 Borders Books and Music / Brentano's - closed all locations in 2011
 Coles...The Book People
 Crown Books / SuperCrown - closed all locations in 2001
 Davis-Kidd Booksellers
 Encore Books
 Family Christian Stores - closed all locations in 2017
 Frys Electronics - closed all locations in Feb. 2021
 Hastings Entertainment - closed all locations in Oct. 2016
 Kroch's and Brentano's
 Media Play
 Oxford Bookstore, offline chain of bookstores in the U.S.
 Waldenbooks

See also
List of independent bookstores
List of feminist bookstores

References

Chains
.